Cambria Productions was the West Hollywood, California animation production studio most famous for its wide usage of the Syncro-Vox technique of animation developed by Edwin Gillette, who was a co-partner in the studio.

Owned by Clark S. Haas, Jr. from 1957 until 1965, the studio produced Clutch Cargo (1959-1960), Space Angel (1962), Captain Fathom (1965), and The New 3 Stooges (1965-1966). A test film for another series, Doc Potts or Doc Potts and Weselly, was prepared in 1960, though the series was apparently never produced. Two sample episodes of a proposed Moon Mullins series were produced along with a sales film to promote it to local television stations, but it didn't clear enough markets to go into production.

Despite operating on a shoestring budget, the studio was able to produce series which are fondly remembered for their imaginative and entertaining storylines, and for their inventive ways of compensating for budgetary limitations.

Among the artists and entertainers who found employment at Cambria Studios were musician/composer Paul Horn, Margaret Kerry, Hal Smith, Alex Toth, Warren Tufts and Doug Wildey. Wildey's and Toth's artistic styles (both were established in the comic book industry) were evident throughout Cambria's existence. Wildey carried much of it over to Hanna-Barbera when he joined that studio in 1962; he created Jonny Quest for Hanna-Barbera, a series with artistic models more akin to Cambria's than to Hanna-Barbera's. Toth also joined Hanna-Barbera after leaving Cambria, where he created several of Hanna-Barbera's action series of the late 1960s.

References

Alberto's Page of American Animators active until 1970 - Letter H
 "Don't believe your eyes! How 'Clutch Cargo' cuts corners as a television comic strip." TV Guide December 24, 1960, p. 28-29.

External links 
 Toonopedia's Clutch Cargo page

1957 establishments in California
1965 disestablishments in California
American companies established in 1957
American companies disestablished in 1965
Mass media companies established in 1957
Mass media companies disestablished in 1965
American animation studios
Companies based in Los Angeles County, California